Obadiah Samuel Newnham (23 March 1848, Leamington Hastings – 13 May 1932, St. Stephen, New Brunswick) was Archdeacon of Fredericton from 1907 until his death.

He held incumbencies at Pointe-du-Chêne, Saint John, Hampton and St Stephen. He was a Canon of Fredericton Cathedral from  1901 to 1907; and Secretary of the Diocesan Synod from 1888 until his death.

Notes

Archdeacons of Fredericton
19th-century Canadian Anglican priests
20th-century Canadian Anglican priests
1848 births
1932 deaths
People from Warwickshire